Iphitrachelus is a genus of parasitoid wasps belonging to the family Platygastridae.

The genus has almost cosmopolitan distribution.

Species:
 Iphitrachelus africanus Huggert, 1976
 Iphitrachelus canadensis Masner, 1976

References

Platygastridae
Hymenoptera genera